

Acts of Senedd Cymru

References

2023